Canal+ is a French subscription provider associated to the channel of the same name. It is owned by Vivendi (owner of Canal+) with a hundred percent share.

History
In 1992, Canalsatellite was launched, the shareholders were Canal+ Group (66 percent) and Lagardère Active (34 percent), a subsidiary of Lagardère.

On 27 April 1996, Canalsatellite launched as a digital satellite platform, which was the first in Europe.

An inside account of the rise of Canal+ and establishment of Canalsatellite as a major satellite TV provider in Europe is given in the book High Above, which tells the story of the foundation and development of the leading European satellite operator, SES Astra.

In late 2005, Canal+ acquired its competitor TPS.

On 15 November 2016, Canalsat was rebranded as Canal.

In 2017, Canal lost Discovery and NBCUniversal channels, recovered by SFR. Canal replaced them by exclusive newly-launched channels: Warner TV, Polar+, Viceland and Novelas TV.

On 27 May 2019, Canal+ bought M7 Group for 1 billion euro.

On 1 August 2019, Canal was renamed Canal+ to bring the same name all around the world.

Canal+ is the French distributor of Disney Channels France/FNG France and Disney+ (with a Disney+ TV channel).

Overseas operations 
 Canal+ Afrique
 Canal+ Calédonie
 Canal+ Caraïbes
 Canal+ Réunion

References

External links 
 
 Official site for Switzerland

Direct broadcast satellite services
Streaming television
Television in France
Canal+